Burlington Township is a township in Des Moines County, Iowa, USA.

History
Burlington Township was organized in 1841.

References

Townships in Des Moines County, Iowa
Townships in Iowa